Devin Miles Haney (born November 17, 1998) is an American professional boxer. He is the current undisputed lightweight champion, having held the WBC title since 2019 and the WBA (Super), IBF, WBO and Ring titles since 2022. As of June 2022, he is ranked as the world's best active lightweight by the Transnational Boxing Rankings Board, first by BoxRec and first by ESPN.

Early life
Haney was born in San Francisco and lived in Oakland, California as a child, but moved to Las Vegas with his father Bill at the age of 14. He started boxing at the age of seven.

Professional career
On February 2, 2018, Haney was scheduled to fight Filipino Harmonito Dela Torre in an eight-round opening bout. Dela Torre had problems obtaining a visa and subsequently withdrew from the fight. Unable to find an opponent, the date was scrapped.

On January 11, 2019, Haney dominated a very tough opponent in Xolisani Ndongeni on the way to a 10-round unanimous decision win.

On May 25, 2019, Haney defeated Antonio Moran via a vicious seventh-round knockout, in his first match under the Matchroom banner.

On September 13, 2019, Haney defeated Zaur Abdullaev (11–0) to win the vacant WBC interim lightweight title.

WBC lightweight champion 
In October 2019, Haney became the youngest (i.e. latest-born) world champion in boxing when he was elevated as the WBC lightweight champion after previous WBC lightweight champion Vasiliy Lomachenko was promoted to "Franchise Champion" by the WBC.

Haney vs. Santiago 
On the undercard of KSI vs. Logan Paul II in November 2019, Haney made his first title defense against Alfredo Santiago (12–0), and won by unanimous decision. He injured his shoulder during the fight, requiring surgery that would keep him out until the summer of 2020. He maintained the title "champion in recess."

Controversial comments about Vasiliy Lomachenko 
In April 2020, Haney claimed that he could beat unified lightweight champion Vasiliy Lomachenko during an interview with 78SportsTV. When asked if would "end the hype of Loma", Haney said, "I'll tell you this. I will never lose to a white boy in my life. I don't care what nobody got to say. Fight a white boy 10 times, I'm going to beat him 10 times." Haney was criticized for this racist comment. Haney came out on Twitter after and said, "I'm not racist and I never will be a racist. I'm chasing greatness." He also said he spoke with WBC president Mauricio Sulaimán and "confirmed to him directly my commitment to be a role model and my absolute rejection of discrimination of any kind." Haney's comments were compared to Bernard Hopkins' declaration that he would "never let a white boy beat me" before his fight with Joe Calzaghe, which Hopkins lost.

Haney vs. Gamboa 
On October 2, 2020, it was revealed that Haney would make the second defense of his WBC lightweight title against the former unified featherweight titlist Yuriorkis Gamboa, on November 7, 2020. The bout was held at the Hard Rock Live in Hollywood, Florida, and was broadcast by DAZN. Most media members predicted an easy victory for the reigning champion, which was reflected in the betting odds as well, with most odds-makers having Haney as a -5000 favorite. Haney won the fight by a dominant unanimous decision, with two of the judges awarding him every single round of the fight, while the third judge scored it 118–109 in favor of Haney. Gamboa was deducted a point in the eleventh round for holding. Haney out-landed Gamboa 133 to 84 in total punches, and 82 to 63 in power punches landed.

Haney vs. Linares 

In what was seen by many as Haney's toughest test of his career so far, Haney made the third defense of his WBC lightweight title against former three-weight world champion Jorge Linares on May 29, 2021. He won by unanimous decision with the judges scoring the bout 116–112, 116–112, 115–113 in his favor. Haney controlled the action for most of the fight, but was hurt when Linares caught him with a powerful right-left combination toward the end of the tenth round. Haney survived the final two rounds largely by tying Linares up and negating his opponent's attempts at trying to engage with him. The crowd voiced their displeasure with what they perceived as excessive clinching by booing Haney when he jumped up on the ropes in celebration immediately after the final bell, as well as booing during the announcement of the official decision.

Haney vs. Diaz 
Joseph Diaz had been scheduled to defend his WBC interim lightweight title against Ryan García on November 27, 2021, until García withdrew from the fight due to a hand injury. This led to back and forth on social media between Haney and Diaz, culminating in an official announcement on November 3 that Diaz would now be challenging for Haney's full world title on December 4, instead of defending his interim title against García. On the night, Haney defeated Diaz by unanimous decision, with scores of 117–111, 117–111, 116–112 in his favor. After the fight, the victor announced his desire to face unified champion George Kambosos Jr. for all four major world titles in the lightweight division, stating, "Let's do it for all the belts. The real undisputed."

Haney vs. Kambosos Jr. 

In front of a sold-out crowd in Melbourne, Australia in June 2022, Haney defeated George Kambosos Jr. by outpointing and outboxing the Australian fighter to become the first undisputed lightweight champion in the four-belt era. The judges scored the bout 116–112, 116–112, 118–110, all in favor of Haney. The deal for the fight included an automatic rematch clause which Kambosos exercised, with the rematch occurring in October 2022 in Australia.

Haney vs. Kambosos Jr. II 

Devin Haney and George Kambosos Jr. met in their rematch at Rod Laver Arena in Melbourne, Australia on October 16, 2022. Haney defeated Kambosos via unanimous decision with the scores of 118–110 (twice) and 119–109.

Professional boxing record

See also
List of world lightweight boxing champions

References

External links

|-

|-

|-

|-

|-

|-

|-

|-

|-

|-

|-

1998 births
Living people
Boxers from San Francisco
Featherweight boxers
Super-featherweight boxers
World lightweight boxing champions
World Boxing Council champions
World Boxing Association champions
International Boxing Federation champions
World Boxing Organization champions
The Ring (magazine) champions
American Muslims
Converts to Islam